This is a list of Spanish television related events from 1956.

Events
 28 October: La 1 (Spanish TV channel) is launched. First television service in Spain.

Debuts
 A las diez en mi barrio.
 Desde mi butaca.
 Las Gomas.
 Imagen de una vida.

Births
 12 January – Ana Rosa Quintana, journalist, hostess.
 15 January – Bermúdez, host.
 15 January – José Antonio Álvarez Gundín, journalist.
 4 April – Norma Duval, hostess.
 26 April – Imanol Arias, actor.
 1 July – Ernesto Sáenz de Buruaga, journalist.
 12 August – Mikel Lejarza, producer and director.
 Antonio San José, journalist.
 Izaskun Azurmendi, actress and hostess.

See also
1956 in Spain
List of Spanish films of 1956

References